Super Chef is a cookery competition by Tropical in Mauritius broadcast in French. It was created for Mauritians amateurs to encourage emerging talents. It offers creativity within a tried and trusted formula. It first aired on MBC 1 in 2011.Season 3 debuted on 3 October 2014.

Mauritian television series
Mauritius Broadcasting Corporation original programming
2011 Mauritian television series debuts